Hondros is a Greek surname. Notable people with the surname include:

 Demetrius Hondros (1882–1962), Greek physicist
 Chris Hondros (1970–2011), American war photographer
 Hondros, a 2017 American documentary film about Chris Hondros
 Ernest Hondros

Greek-language surnames